H. juncea may refer to:

 Heliophila juncea, a plant endemic to southern Africa
 Hypoxis juncea, a star-grass with narrow leaves